Agathodes ostentalis, the coral tree moth, is a species of moth of the family Crambidae described by Carl Geyer in 1837. It is found from India to Indonesia, including Hong Kong, Japan, Thailand and in Australia in New South Wales and Queensland. 

The wingspan is about 25 mm.

The larvae have been recorded feeding on the foliage Erythrina indica and Erythrina vespertillio.

External links
 "Agathodes ostentalis (Geyer, 1837) Coral Tree Moth". Australian Caterpillars and their Butterflies and Moths. Retrieved 9 March 2018.
 "Coral Tree Pyralid Moth (Crambidae Pyraustinae Agathodes ostentalis - Geyer, 1837)". Archived from the original 25 July 2011.

Spilomelinae
Moths of Asia
Moths of Australia
Moths described in 1837